The Philippine House Committee on Legislative Franchises, or House Legislative Franchises Committee is a standing committee of the Philippine House of Representatives.

Jurisdiction 
As prescribed by House Rules, the committee's jurisdiction is on the grant, amendment, extension or revocation of franchises.

Members, 19th Congress

See also 
 House of Representatives of the Philippines
 List of Philippine House of Representatives committees
 ABS-CBN franchise renewal controversy
 Meralco franchise renewal controversy

References

External links 
House of Representatives of the Philippines

Legislative Franchises